Haplochromis gowersii is a species of cichlid endemic to Lake Victoria.  This species can reach a length of  SL. The specific name of this taxon honours the former Governor of Uganda William Frederick Gowers (1875-1954).

References

gowersii
Fish described in 1928
Taxonomy articles created by Polbot